Hale Street  may refer to:

Hale Street, Brisbane, a road in Australia
a hamlet in Kent, England in the civil and ecclesiastical parishes of East Peckham